Vista Santa Rosa (Spanish for "Saint Rose View") is a census-designated place in Riverside County, California. The 2010 United States census reported Vista Santa Rosa's population was 2,926.

Geography
According to the United States Census Bureau, the CDP covers an area of 16.1 square miles (41.8 km), 99.92% of it land and 0.08% of it water.

Demographics
At the 2010 census Vista Santa Rosa had a population of 2,926. The racial makeup of Vista Santa Rosa was 1,699 (58.1%) White, 8 (0.3%) African American, 140 (4.8%) Native American, 6 (0.2%) Asian, 0 (0.0%) Pacific Islander, 942 (32.2%) from other races, and 131 (4.5%) from two or more races. Hispanic or Latino of any race were 2,487 persons (85.0%).

The whole population lived in households, no one lived in non-institutionalized group quarters and no one was institutionalized.

There were 745 households, 423 (56.8%) had children under the age of 18 living in them, 491 (65.9%) were opposite-sex married couples living together, 104 (14.0%) had a female householder with no husband present, 54 (7.2%) had a male householder with no wife present. There were 39 (5.2%) unmarried opposite-sex partnerships, and 7 (0.9%) same-sex married couples or partnerships. 70 households (9.4%) were one person and 19 (2.6%) had someone living alone who was 65 or older. The average household size was 3.93. There were 649 families (87.1% of households); the average family size was 4.15.

The age distribution was 948 people (32.4%) under the age of 18, 312 people (10.7%) aged 18 to 24, 774 people (26.5%) aged 25 to 44, 652 people (22.3%) aged 45 to 64, and 240 people (8.2%) who were 65 or older. The median age was 29.8 years. For every 100 females, there were 110.8 males. For every 100 females age 18 and over, there were 105.8 males.

There were 856 housing units at an average density of 53.1 per square mile, of the occupied units 450 (60.4%) were owner-occupied and 295 (39.6%) were rented. The homeowner vacancy rate was 4.8%; the rental vacancy rate was 5.1%. 1,737 people (59.4% of the population) lived in owner-occupied housing units and 1,189 people (40.6%) lived in rental housing units.

References

Census-designated places in Riverside County, California
Census-designated places in California